MK-212 (CPP or 6-chloro-2-(1-piperazinyl)pyrazine) is a serotonin agonist. It promotes the secretion of serum prolactin and cortisol in humans.

Pharmacology
In an experiment performed by Clineschidt and colleagues, they dosed mice with varying concentrations of MK-212, and observed its effects.
The result correlated very well to binding of indolealkylamine receptors, such as the serotonin and tryptamine receptors, which shows four characteristics. Namely, increased frequency of muscle twitching, increased twitching of the head, "an increase in the strength of the crossed extensor reflex in the acutely spinalized rat", and the cause of complex motor syndrome.

See also 
 2C-B-PP
 mCPP
 ORG-12962
 Quipazine

References 

Chloroarenes
Piperazines
Pyrazines
Serotonin receptor agonists